Delaware County is a county in the east central portion of the U.S. state of Indiana. As of 2020, the population was 111,903. The county seat is Muncie.

Delaware County is part of the Muncie, IN metropolitan statistical area, which is part of the larger Indianapolis-Carmel-Muncie CSA.

History

Delaware County was authorized in Jan. 1820 on New Purchase lands south of the Wabash River gained with the 1818 Treaty of St. Mary's. It encompassed the drainage basin of the White River, along which the Delaware, a Native American people had settled, and from which the County takes its name. The Delaware people were moved to lands west of the Mississippi River in the 1840s. The county was once home to Tenskwatawa ("The Prophet"), a brother of Tecumseh who instigated a major Indian uprising in 1811 culminating in the Battle of Tippecanoe. David Conner, a trader, was the first white settler, arriving in the early 1810s. After formation, numerous counties were carved from the original, and a remnant retaining the original name was organized in 1827.

Following the American Civil War the county experienced an economic boom caused by the discovery of natural gas, which spurred rapid industrial growth in the surrounding area.

The first discovery of natural gas in Indiana occurred in 1876 near Eaton. A company was drilling in search of coal, and when they had reaching a depth of six-hundred feet, there was a loud noise and foul-smelling fumes came from the well. After a brief investigation, it was decided they had breached the ceiling of Hell, and the hole was quickly filled in. In 1884, when natural gas was discovered in nearby Ohio, people recalled the incident. They returned to the spot and opened Indiana's first natural gas well. The gas was so abundant and strong that when the well was lit, the flames could be seen from Muncie.

Geography
Delaware County consists of low rolling prairie, accented by waterways. The Mississinewa River flows westward through the northern part of the county while the White River runs westward through the central part of the county, through Muncie. A large reservoir, Prairie Creek Reservoir, SE of Muncie is managed by the city. The soil is fertile. The county's high point is a hilly area in its SE corner, 4 miles (6 km) ESE from Prairie Creek Reservoir.

Major highways

  Interstate 69
  U.S. Route 35
  State Road 3
  State Road 28
  State Road 32
  State Road 67
  State Road 167
  State Road 332

Adjacent counties

 Blackford County - north
 Jay County - northeast
 Randolph County - east
 Henry County - south
 Madison County - west
 Grant County - northwest

Cities and towns

 Albany - town
 Chesterfield - town
 Daleville - town
 Eaton - town
 Gaston - town
 Muncie - city
 Selma - town
 Yorktown - town

Unincorporated communities

 Anthony
 Bethel
 Cammack
 Cowan
 Cross Roads
 DeSoto
 Gates Corner
 Granville
 Janney
 Medford
 Middletown Park
 Mt Pleasant
 New Burlington
 Oakville
 Progress
 Reed Station
 Royerton
 Smithfield
 Stockport
 West Muncie
 Wheeling

Townships

 Center
 Delaware
 Hamilton
 Harrison
 Liberty
 Monroe
 Mount Pleasant
 Niles
 Perry
 Salem
 Union
 Washington

Climate and weather

Government

The county government is a constitutional body, granted specific powers by the Constitution of Indiana and the Indiana Code.

County Council: The legislative branch of the county government; controls spending and revenue collection in the county. There are seven members of the county council. Three are elected county-wide and four are elected from county districts. The county-wide members are elected in presidential election years (2016, 2020, etc.) and the districted members are elected in midterm election years (2018, 2022, etc.). The current members are:
 District 1: Daniel Flanagan (R)
 District 2: William Hughes (R)
 District 3: Matt Kantz (R)
 District 4: Jane Lasater (R)
 At-Large: Eugene Whitehead (R)
 At-Large: Jessica Piper (R)
 At-large: Ryan Webb (R)
The council members serve four-year terms. They are responsible for setting salaries, the annual budget, and special spending. The council also has limited authority to impose local taxes, in the form of an income and property tax that is subject to state level approval, excise taxes, and service taxes.

Board of Commissioners: The executive body of the county. Each commissioner represents a district (in which they must reside). The commissioners are elected county-wide to staggered four-year terms. The current commissioners are:
 District 1: James King (R)
 District 2: Sherry Riggin (R)
 District 3: Shannon Henry (R) 
One commissioners serves as president. The commissioners are charged with executing the acts legislated by the council, collecting revenue, and managing the day-to-day functions of the county government.

Court: The county maintains five circuit courts, each with its own judge. The judges are elected in staggered six-year terms on a county-wide, partisan ballot. The current judges are:
 Circuit Court 1: Judi Calhoun (R)
 Circuit Court 2: Kimberly Dowling (D)
 Circuit Court 3: Linda Ralu Wolf (D)
 Circuit Court 4: John Feick (R)
 Circuit Court 5: Thomas Cannon Jr. (D)
In some cases, court decisions can be appealed to the state level court of appeals.

County Officials: The county has several other elected offices, including sheriff, coroner, auditor, treasurer, recorder, surveyor, prosecutor, assessor, and circuit court clerk:
 Sheriff: Tony Skinner (R)
 Coroner: Gavin Greene (R)
 Auditor: Ed Carroll (R)
 Treasurer: Brad Polk (R)
 Recorder: Jan Smoot (R)
 Surveyor: Tom Borchers (R)
 Prosecutor: Eric Hoffman (D)
 Assessor: James Carmichael (R)
 Clerk: Rick Spangler (R)
Each serves a four-year term. Members elected to county government positions are required to declare party affiliations and to be residents of the county.

Delaware County is part of Indiana's 5th congressional district; Indiana Senate district 26; and Indiana House of Representatives districts 33, 34 and 35.

Demographics

2020 Census
As of the 2020 United States Census, there were 111,903 people and 46,026 households in the county. The racial makeup of the county was 88.7% white, 7.2% African American, 0.3% American Indian or Alaska Native, 1.3% Asian, 0.1% Native Hawaiian or Pacific Islander, 2.6% Hispanic or Latino and 2.4% were from two or more races.

4.8% of the population were age 5 or younger, 18.2% were under the age of 18, 64.3% were between the ages of 18 and 64, and 17.5% were age 65 or older. 48.2% were male and 51.8% were female. The average household size was 2.34. 3.4% of households had a language other than English spoken at home.

88.1% of households had a computer present and 78.3% had a broadband Internet connection. 13.1% of the population under 65 had a disability and 10.3% of that same age group had no health insurance. 58.5% of the population was in the civilian labor force. (54.8% of females) Total retail sales per capita was $12,950.

The median household income in Delaware County was $43,512 and the per capita income from May 2019 to April 2020 was $25,107. 21.5% of the population was in poverty.

2010 census
As of the 2010 United States Census, there were 117,671 people, 46,516 households, and 27,956 families in the county. The racial makeup of the county was 89.1% white, 6.9% black or African American, 1.0% Asian, 0.3% American Indian, 0.1% Pacific islander, 0.6% from other races, and 2.1% from two or more races. Those of Hispanic or Latino origin made up 1.8% of the population. In terms of ancestry, 23.0% were German, 14.2% were Irish, 10.6% were American, and 10.3% were English.

Of the 46,516 households, 27.2% had children under the age of 18 living with them, 43.4% were married couples living together, 12.2% had a female householder with no husband present, 39.9% were non-families, and 29.6% of all households were made up of individuals. The average household size was 2.34 and the average family size was 2.87. The median age was 34.8 years.

The median income for a household in the county was $47,697 and the median income for a family was $51,394. Males had a median income of $42,346 versus $31,051 for females. The per capita income for the county was $20,405. About 12.3% of families and 20.2% of the population were below the poverty line, including 22.1% of those under age 18 and 6.6% of those age 65 or over.

See also
 National Register of Historic Places listings in Delaware County, Indiana

Notes

References

External links
 Delaware County, Indiana Geographic Information System
 Delaware County Weather
 Muncie Free Press - Delaware County News and Information
 Downtown Muncie
 ScanMuncie - Online Community Forums & Online Public Safety Radio Scanners
 Ball State University - External link
 Ball State University Libraries - External link

 
Indiana counties
1827 establishments in Indiana
Populated places established in 1827